Gustavus Detlef Hinrichs (2 December 1836 – 14 February 1923) was a chemist and natural philosopher most widely known for his findings on periodic laws within the chemical elements.

Life
Hinrichs was born in 1836 in Lunden in the Duchy of Holstein, which at that time was under the rule of Denmark although it was simultaneously part of the German Confederation. He attended the local polytechnic school and the University of Copenhagen. During his schooling he published several articles and books, including descriptions of the magnetic field of earth and its interaction with the aether.

Hinrichs graduated in 1860, between the First and Second Schleswig Wars.  He emigrated later that year to the United States, settling initially in Davenport, Iowa, where he taught school, then in nearby Iowa City. In 1863 he was appointed a professor of natural philosophy, chemistry, and modern languages at the University of Iowa. He founded the first state weather and crop service in the United States and headed the Iowa Weather Service until 1886. He was first to identify and name the straight-line storm phenomenon he called the "derecho." He stayed at the University of Iowa until 1886, when he was fired by the state Board of Regents due to disputes with the university president and faculty colleagues. He became a professor at the St. Louis University in 1889 and taught there until his retirement in 1907.

Periodic law
Hinrichs is one of the discoverers of the periodic laws, which are the basis for the periodic table of elements.  Although his contribution is not generally considered as important as those of Dmitri Mendeleev or Lothar Meyer, he presented his ideas as early as 1855 and published his book Programme der Atommechanik in 1867. His periodic table had the form of a double spiral, and the elements were placed into the structure according to their atomic mass. Hinrichs also postulated a theory on the cause of the periodicity within the chemical elements based on his theory of the composition of elements out of smaller Panatome. The Trigonoides were the nonmetals made from regular triangles, while the metallic Tetragonoides were made from squares. Algebraic formulas of how to mix squares and triangles yielded the periodic laws. His "controversial ideas and colorful personality" proved to be an obstacle to the acceptance of his theories.

References

19th-century German chemists
German emigrants to the United States
University of Iowa faculty
Saint Louis University faculty
1836 births
1923 deaths
University of Copenhagen alumni
People involved with the periodic table